The 21st Annual Latin Grammy Awards were held on Thursday, November 19, 2020 and broadcast on Univision. The 2020 Latin Grammy ceremony was anchored from the American Airlines Arena in Miami, though the health protocols enacted due to the COVID-19 pandemic meant there was no live audience in the venue, and performances were presented from remote locations from many parts of the world. The telecast marked the 21st anniversary of the Latin Grammy Awards and honored musical releases within Latin music released from June 1, 2019 to May 31, 2020. Nominations were announced on September 29.

Background 
On March 28, 2020, less than three weeks after the March 11 declaration by the World Health Organization that the COVID-19 outbreak was officially a pandemic, the Latin Recording Academy announced that its annual gala was still set for November 2020.

Starting in 2020, the Latin Grammys would include a category exclusively focused on reggaeton to prevent of the controversies and calls for boycott experienced the year before. Thus, a new category named "Best Reggaeton Performance" was introduced this year.

Also starting with the 2020 awards, the Latin Recording Academy announced that it would stop using the term "urban music" in response to controversies which had led its sister organization, The Recording Academy, to announce changes to the names of some that academy's Grammy Awards categories six months after its own January 2020 awards presentations. "Best Pop/Rock Song" and "Best Rap/Hip Hop Song" replaced the "urban" categories, with the latter one including trap music. The "Best Flamenco Album" category made its return to the Latin Grammys after being erased in 2018, due to the lack of competition.

On August 18, the Latin Recording Academy announced the official date for the gala's celebration and its format. Under the slogan "Music Humanizes Us", the 2020 Latin Grammy Awards was returning to Miami, for the first time since the 2003 ceremony. In that announcement, the Latin Grammys organization stated: "If local conditions are favorable in November, The Latin Academy will consider hosting a live audience telecast composed primarily of nominees, presenters and performers."

In November, due to the ongoing pandemic, the ceremony was held without a live audience in the venue, and featured remote performances from all around the world. As a result of the pandemic, the special awards, namely the Latin Recording Academy Person of the Year, Latin Grammy Lifetime Achievement Award, and the Latin Grammy Trustees Award, were not presented this year.

Originally, Carlos Rivera and Roselyn Sánchez were announced as hosts for the ceremony but Sánchez could not continue as host due to health issues. Later, actresses Yalitza Aparicio and Ana Brenda Contreras were announced as hosts alongside Rivera, but a few days later Rivera cancelled his participation due to a COVID-19 case in his team. Then, singer Victor Manuelle was announced as performer and also host with Aparicio and Contreras.

Performances

Presenters 
Leslie Grace and Prince Royce – presented Best Urban Music Album
Natalia Jiménez and Sebastián Yatra – presented Best Tropical Song
Ivy Queen – presented Best Singer-Songwriter Album
Pedro Capó – presented Best New Artist
Yalitza Aparicio and Ana Brenda Contreras – presented Best Ranchero/Mariachi Album
Debi Nova and Alex Cuba – introduced Kany García, Nahuel Pennisi, Pedro Capó and Camilo
Juanes – presented Record of the Year
Lin-Manuel Miranda – introduced Bad Bunny
Kany García – presented Best Pop Song
Mike Bahía – introduced Anitta
Ricardo Montaner – presented Song of the Year
Feid and Greeicy – introduced Anuel AA
Victor Manuelle – presented Album of the Year

Winners and nominees 
The following is the list of nominees.

General
Record of the Year
 "Contigo" - Alejandro Sanz
 Julio Reyes Copello & Rafa Sardina, producers; James Fitzpatick, Jan Holzner, Nicolás Ramírez, Julio Reyes Copello & Rafa Sardina, recording engineers; Nicolás Ramírez, mixer; Carlos Hernández Carbonell, mastering engineer
Anuel AA, Daddy Yankee, Karol G, Ozuna, J Balvin — "China"
Marco Masis "Tainy", producer; Luis "Wichie" Ortiz, recording engineer; Luis "Wichie" Ortiz & Juan G. Rivera, mixers; Luis "Wichie" Ortiz & Juan G. Rivera, mastering engineers
Pablo Alborán — "Cuando estés aquí"
Pablo Alborán, record producer; Pablo Alborán, recording engineer; Oscar Clavel, mixer; Oscar Clavel, mastering engineer
 Bad Bunny — "Vete"
Cesar Oscar Batista Escalera, Jose Carlos Cruz, Freddy Momtalvo, Ivaniel Ortiz, Edgar Wilmer Semper-Vargas & Xavier Alexis Semper-Vargas, record producers; La Paciencia, recording engineer; Josh Gudwin, mixer; Colin Leonard, mastering engineer
 Bajofondo featuring Cuareim 1080 — "Solari Yacumenza"
Juan Campodónico & Gustavo Santaolalla, record producers; Julio Berta, recording engineer; Juan Campodónico, Aníbal Kerpel & Gustavo Santaolalla, mixers; Tom Baker, mastering engineer
J Balvin — "Rojo"
Alejandro "Sky" Ramírez & Taiko, record producers; Joel Iglesias, recording engineer; Josh Gudwin, mixer; Colin Leonard, mastering engineer
Camilo featuring Pedro Capó — "Tutu"
Jon Leone, Richi López & George Noriega, record producers; Camilo, Jon Leone, Richi López & George Noriega, recording engineers; Juan G. Rivera, mixer; Mike Bozzi, mastering engineer
Kany García and Nahuel Pennisi — "Lo que en ti veo"
Julio Reyes Copello, record producer; Sebastián Ezequiel Sanabria, Carlos Fernando López, Nicolás Ramírez, Julio Reyes Copello, Marcos Sánchez & Daniel Uribe, recording engineers; Marcos Sánchez, mixer; Gene Grimaldi, mastering engineer
Karol G and Nicki Minaj — "Tusa"
Daniel Oviedo Echevarria, record producer; Daniel Oviedo Echevarria, recording engineer; Rob Kinelski, mixer; Dave Kutch, mastering engineer
Residente — "René"
Residente, record producer; Phil Joly & Carlos Velázquez, recording engineers; Beatriz Artola, mixer; Ted Jensen, mastering engineer

Album of the Year
Natalia Lafourcade — Un Canto por México, Vol. 1

Kiko Campos, album producer; José Luis Fernández & Rubén López Arista, album recording engineers; Rubén López Arista, album mixer; Natalia Lafourcade, songwriter; Michael Fuller, album mastering engineer
Bad Bunny — YHLQMDLG
Henry De La Prida & Marco Masis "Tainy", album producers; La Paciencia, album recording engineer; Josh Gudwin, album mixer; Bad Bunny, songwriter; Colin Leonard, album mastering engineer
J Balvin and Bad Bunny — Oasis
Marco Masis "Tainy" & Alejandro "Sky" Ramírez, album producers; Joel Iglesias, Marco Masis "Tainy", Alejandro "Sky" Ramírez & Roberto Rosado, album recording engineers; Josh Gudwin, album mixer; Bad Bunny, J Balvin, Marco Masis "Tainy" & Alejandro "Sky" Ramírez, songwriters; Colin Leonard, album mastering engineer
J Balvin — Colores
Alejandro "Sky" Ramírez, album producer; Joel Iglesias, album recording engineer; Josh Gudwin, album mixer; J Balvin, Michael Brun, Rene Cano & Alejandro"Sky" Ramírez, songwriters; Colin Leonard, album mastering engineer
Camilo — Por Primera Vez
Camilo, Jon Leone, Richi López & Ricardo Montaner, album producers; Jon Leone & Richi López, album recording engineers; Édgar Barrera, Camilo, Jon Leone & Richi López, songwriters; Mike Bozzi, album mastering engineer
Kany García — Mesa Para Dos
Julio Reyes Copello, album producer; Nicolás Ramírez, Julio Reyes Copello & Daniel Uribe, album recording engineers; Nicolás Ramírez & Marcos Sánchez, album mixers; Kany García, songwriter; Gene Grimaldi, album mastering engineer
Jesse & Joy — Aire (Versión Día)
Charlie Heat, Jesse Huerta & Martin Terefe, album producers; Oskar Winberg, album recording engineer; Josh Gudwin, album mixer; Jason Boyd & Jesse & Joy, songwriters; Colin Leonard, album mastering engineer
Ricky Martin — Pausa
Julio Reyes Copello & Jean Rodríguez, album producers; Nicolás De La Espriella, Enrique Larreal & Julio Reyes Copello, album recording engineers; Jaycen Joshua, album mixer; Ricky Martin & Danay Suárez, songwriters; Felipe Tichauer, album mastering engineer
Fito Páez — La Conquista del Espacio
Gustavo Borner, Diego Olivero & Fito Paez, album producers; Gustavo Borner & Phil Levine, album recording engineers; Gustavo Borner, album mixer; Fito Paez, songwriter; Justin Moshkevich, album mastering engineer
Carlos Vives — Cumbiana
Andrés Leal, Martín Velilla & Carlos Vives, album producers; Andrés Borda, Nicolas Cajamarca, Jorge Corredor, Daniel Cortés, Chris Crawford, Einar Escaf, Sancho Gómez Escolar, Lobzan Graciani, Andrés Leal, Harbey Marín, Dave Rowland & Martín Velilla, album recording engineers; Manny Marroquin, album mixer; Carlos Vives, songwriter; Michelle Mancini, album mastering engineer

Song of the Year
 "René"
Residente, songwriter (Residente)
"ADMV"
Vicente Barco, Édgar Barrera, Maluma & Stiven Rojas, songwriters (Maluma)
"Bonita"
Juanes, Mauricio Rengifo, Andrés Torres & Sebastián Yatra, songwriters (Juanes and Sebastian Yatra)
"Codo con codo"
 Jorge Drexler, songwriter (Jorge Drexler)
"El Mismo Aire"
 Édgar Barrera, Camilo, Jon Leone, Richi López & Juan Morelli, songwriters (Camilo)
"For Sale"
 Alejandro Sanz & Carlos Vives, songwriters (Alejandro Sanz and Carlos Vives)
"#ElMundoFuera" (Improvisación)
 Alejandro Sanz, songwriter (Alejandro Sanz)
"Lo que en ti veo"
 Kany García, songwriter (Kany García & Nahuel Pennisi)
"Tiburones"
 Oscar Hernández & Pablo Preciado, songwriters (Ricky Martin)
"Tusa"
 Kevyn Mauricio Cruz Moreno, Karol G, Nicki Minaj & Daniel Oviedo Echavarría, songwriters (Karol G and Nicki Minaj)
"Tutu"
 Camilo, Jon Leone & Richi López, songwriters (Camilo featuring Pedro Capó)

Best New Artist
 Mike Bahía
Anuel AA
Rauw Alejandro
Cazzu
Conociendo Rusia
Soy Emilia
Kurt
Nicki Nicole
Nathy Peluso
Pitizion
WOS

Pop
Best Pop Vocal Album
Ricky Martin — Pausa
Aitana — Spoiler
Beret — Prisma
Camilo — Por Primera Vez
Juanes — Más futuro que pasado

Best Traditional Pop Vocal Album
Andrés Cepeda and Fonseca — Compadres
Reyli Barba — La Metamorfosis
Andrés Cepeda — Trece
Gaby Moreno and Van Dyke Parks — ¡Spangled!
José Luis Perales — Mirándote a los Ojos

Best Pop Song
"Tutu" — Camilo, Jon Leone & Richi López, songwriters (Camilo featuring Pedro Capó)
 "Amor en Cuarentena" — Raquel Sofía, songwriter (Raquel Sofía)
 "Bonita" — Juanes, Mauricio Rengifo, Andrés Torres & Sebastián Yatra, songwriters (Juanes and Sebastian Yatra)
 "Cuando estés aquí" — Pablo Alborán, songwriter (Pablo Alborán)
 "Una vez más" — Elsa Carvajal, Grettel Garibaldi, Susana Isaza & Ximena Sariñana, songwriters (Ximena Sariñana)

Urban
Best Urban Fusion/Performance
Rosalía and Ozuna — "Yo x Ti, Tu x Mi"
Anuel AA, Daddy Yankee, Karol G, Ozuna, J Balvin — "China"
Bad Bunny, Duki and Pablo Chill-E — "Hablamos Mañana"
J Balvin — "Azul"
Ricky Martin, Residente and Bad Bunny — "Cántalo"

Best Reggaeton Performance
Bad Bunny — "Yo Perreo Sola"
J Balvin — "Morado"
DJ Snake and J Balvin featuring Tyga — "Loco Contigo"
Feid and Justin Quiles — "Porfa"
Guaynaa featuring Cauty — "Chicharrón"
Ozuna — "Te Soñé de Nuevo"
Sech and Ozuna — "Si Te Vas"

Best Urban Music Album
Colores — J BalvinEmmanuel — Anuel AA
YHLQMDLG — Bad Bunny
Oasis — J Balvin and Bad Bunny
FERXXO (VOL. 1: M.O.R) — Feid
Nibiru — Ozuna
1 of 1 — Sech
Easy Money Baby — Myke Towers

Best Rap/Hip Hop Song"Antes Que El Mundo Se Acabe" — Residente, songwriter (Residente) "Baile del Dinero" — Anuel AA, songwriter (Anuel AA)
 "Goteo" — Duki, songwriter (Duki)
 "Kemba Walker" — Eladio Carrión and Bad Bunny, songwriters (Eladio Carrión and Bad Bunny)
 "Medusa" — Anuel AA, J Balvin, Jhay Cortez, Josias De La Cruz, Misael De La Cruz, Sergio Roldan, Elvin Roubert & Nydia Yera, songwriters (Jhay Cortez, Anuel AA & J Balvin)

Best Urban Song"Yo x Ti, Tu x Mi" — Pablo Diaz-Reixa "El Guincho", Ozuna and Rosalía, songwriters (Rosalía & Ozuna) "Adicto" — Anuel AA, Jhay Cortez, Marco Masis "Tainy" & Ozuna, songwriters (Tainy, Anuel AA y Ozuna)
 "Muchacha" — Alejandro "Pututi" Arce, Ángel Alberto Arce, Luis Eduardo Cedeno Konig "Pucho", Roque Alberto Cedeno Konig "Tucutu", Gente De Zona, Paul Irizarry Suau "Echo", Andrea Mangiamanchi "Elena Rose", Daniel Joel Márquez Díaz, Yasmil Jesús Marrufo & Juan Morelli, songwriters (Gente De Zona y Becky G)
 "Rave de Favela" — Anitta, Tynashe Beam, Diplo, Eric Alberto-Lopez, MC Lan & Tropkillaz, songwriters (MC Lan, Anitta, BEAM and Major Lazer)
 "Rojo" — J Balvin, O 'Neill, Justin Quiles, Alejandro "Sky" Ramírez & Taiko, songwriters (J Balvin)

Rock
Best Rock Album¿Dónde jugaran lxs niñxs? (Desde el Palacio de los Deportes) — MolotovJueves — El Cuarteto de Nos  
Seremos Primavera — Eruca Sativa
Uncotrecua — Miguel Mateos 
Incomunicación — Vetamadre

Best Rock Song"Biutiful" — Mon Laferte, songwriter (Mon Laferte) "Bola de Fuego" — Eduardo Ibeas, Felipe Ilabaca & Cristian Moraga, songwriters (Chancho en Piedra)
 "Creo" — Eruca Sativa, songwriters (Eruca Sativa)
 "Mario Neta" — Roberto Musso, songwriter (El Cuarteto de Nos)
 "Yo Me Los Merezco" — Buika, Drago, Carlos Santana, Stoneface & Jay U Xperience, songwriters (Santana featuring Buika)

Best Pop/Rock AlbumLa Conquista del Espacio — Fito PáezLa Que Manda — Gina Chavez
Cabildo y Juramento — Conociendo Rusia
Acabadabra — Juan Galeano
Pangea — Los Mesoneros

Best Pop/Rock Song"La Canción de las Bestias" — Fito Páez, songwriter (Fito Páez) "Dolerme" — Pablo Diaz-Reixa, Frank Dukes, Rosalía & Matthew Tavares, songwriters (Rosalía)
 "Quiero que me Llames" — Conociendo Rusia, songwriter (Conociendo Rusia)
 "Quiero Vivir" — Draco Rosa & Jaime Sabines, songwriters (Draco Rosa)
 "Últimas Palabras" — Los Mesoneros, songwriters (Los Mesoneros)

Alternative
Best Alternative Music AlbumSobrevolando — Cultura ProféticaDisco Estimulante — Hello Seahorse!
2030 — LOUTA
Miss Colombia — Lido Pimienta
Ubicación en Tiempo Real — Barbi Recanati

Best Alternative Song"En Cantos" — Ismael Cancel, Ile and Natalia Lafourcade, songwriters (Ile & Natalia Lafourcade) "Buenos Aires" — Rafa Arcaute, Pedro Campos and Nathy Peluso, songwriters (Nathy Peluso)
 "Caracoles" — Wilberto Rodríguez, songwriter (Cultura Profética)
 "Carapazón" — Eruca Sativa, songwriters (Eruca Sativa)
 "Chilango Blues" — Mon Laferte, songwriter (Mon Laferte)

Tropical
Best Salsa Album40 — Grupo Niche40 Años de Power — Luisito Ayala and La Puerto Rican Power
Tentaciones Vol. 1 — Charlie Cruz
Memorias de Navidad — Víctor Manuelle
Un Gallo para la Historia — Tito Rojas

Best Cumbia/Vallenato AlbumSigo Cantando al Amor (Deluxe) — Jorge Celedón and Sergio Luis RodríguezPor el Mundo Entero — Binomio de Oro
Dale Play — Kvrass
Voz de Mujer — Karen Lizarazo
La Cumbia Stars Vol. 2 — Los Cumbia Stars

Best Merengue/Bachata AlbumAhora — Eddy HerreraLarimar — Daniel SantacruzThe Genetics of Bachata — José Manuel Calderón
Bailando Contigo — Manny Cruz
Los Conquistadores — Grupo Manía

Best Traditional Tropical AlbumÍcono — Orquesta AragónEste es Nuestro Changüí — Changüí De Guantánamo
Pa'Lante — Ernesto Fernández
Failde con Tumbao — Orquesta Failde
Soy Puro Teatro - Homenaje a La Lupe — Mariaca Semprún

Best Contemporany Tropical/Tropical Fusion AlbumCumbiana — Carlos VivesEnergía Para Regalar — El Caribefunk
Mi Derriengue — Riccie Oriach
Mariposas — Omara Portuondo
Alter Ego — Prince Royce

Best Tropical Song"Canción para Rubén" — Rubén Blades and Carlos Vives, songwriters (Carlos Vives & Rubén Blades) "Búscame" — Kany García and Carlos Vives, songwriters (Kany García and Carlos Vives)
 "Imaginarme sin Ti" — Elvis Crespo & Maribel Vega, songwriters (Elvis Crespo and Manny Cruz)
 "Quédate" — Paula Arenas, Debi Nova & Juan Pablo Vega, songwriters (Debi Nova and Pedro Capó)
 "Y Basta Ya" — Pavel Nuñez, songwriter (Pavel Nuñez)

Songwriter
Best Singer-Songwriter AlbumMesa Para Dos — Kany GarcíaSublime — Alex Cuba
Reciente (Adelanto) — El David Aguilar
3:33 — Debi Nova
Después de Todo — Yordano

Regional Mexican
Best Ranchero/Mariachi AlbumHecho en México — Alejandro FernándezAntología de la Música Ranchera — Aida Cuevas 
A Los 4 Vientos Vol. 1 "Ranchero" — Eugenia León
Bailando Sones y Huapangos con el Mariachi Sol de México de José Hernández — Mariachi Sol De Mexico De José Hernández
AYAYAY! — Christian Nodal

Best Banda AlbumPlaylist — ChiquisTe Encontré — Banda La Ejecutiva De Mazatlán Sinaloa 
Al Rey José Alfredo Jiménez — Banda Lirio
Labios Mentirosos — La Arrolladora Banda El Limón de René Camacho
Salud Por Nuestro 25 Aniversario — La Séptima Banda

Best Tejano AlbumLive in México — La MafiaPa'La Pista y Pa'l Pisto, Vol. 1 — El Plan
25th Anniversary Contigo — Jay Perez and The Band
Película, Vol. 1 — Siggno
It's Time — South Tx Homies

Best Norteño AlbumLos Tigres del Norte at Folsom Prison — Los Tigres Del NorteDe Terán para el Mundo — Buyuchek, La Abuela Irma Silva
Simplemente Gracias — Calibre 50
A Los 4 Vientos Vol. 2 "Norteño" — Eugenia León
La Historia Continúa — Los Cardenales de Nuevo León

Best Regional Song"Mi Religión" — Natalia Lafourcade, songwriter (Natalia Lafourcade) "Ayayay!" — Christian Nodal, songwriter (Christian Nodal)
 "Caballero" — José Luis Roma, songwriter (Alejandro Fernández)
 "Dejaré" — Lupita Infante & Luciano Luna, songwriters (Lupita Infante)
 "#Hashtag" — Gabriel Flores, Wences Romo & Jesus Turner, songwriters (Siggno)

Instrumental
Best Instrumental AlbumTerra — Daniel MinimaliaPlays Daniel Figueiredo — Leo Amuedo
Cartografías — Caetano Brasil
Sotavento — Compasses
Festejo — Yamandu Costa featuring Marcelo Jiran

Traditional
Best Folk AlbumA Capella: Grabado en Casa Durante la Cuarentena — Susana BacaHistorias Cantadas — Gaiteros De Pueblo Santo
Toño García: El último Cacique — Los Gaiteros de San Jacinto
Quinteto con Voz — Quinteto Leopoldo Federico
Aguije — Tierra Adentro

Best Tango AlbumFuelle y Cuerda — Gustavo Casenave QuartetContemporary Tango Trilogy — Alejandro Fasanini
Tango Argentino: Gardel y Piazzella — Jorge Calandrelli
Comme Il Faut — Pablo Estigarribia, Victor Lavallen y Horacio Cabarcos.
Tango Sacro — Rodolfo Mederos

Best Flamenco AlbumFlamenco sin Fronteras — Antonio ReyQuimeras del Tiempo "Ilus3" — Ezequiel Benitez
Tardo Antiguo — Antonio Campos
Vivir — Naike Ponce
Que Suene el Cante — Antonio Reyes

Jazz
Best Latin Jazz/Jazz AlbumPuertos: Music from International Waters — Emilio Solla Tango Jazz OrchestraTradiciones — Afro-Peruvian Jazz Orchestra
Antidote — Chick Corea & The Spanish Heart Band
Carib — David Sánchez
Sonero: The Music of Ismael Rivera — Miguel Zenón

Christian
Best Christian Album (Spanish Language)Soldados — Alex CamposCaminemos con Jesús — Tony Alonso
Único — Amalfi
Atmósfera — Arthur Callazans
¿Quién Dijo Miedo? — Gilberto Daza
A La Medianoche — Elevation Worship
Hay Más — Hillsong Worship
Origen y Esencia — Jesús Adrián Romero

Best Christian Album (Portuguese Language)Reino — Aline BarrosCatarse: Lado A — Daniela Araújo
Profundo — Ministério Mergulhar
Maria Passa À Frente — Padre Marcelo Rossi
Memórias II (Ao Vivo em Belo Horizonte/2019) — Eli Soares

 Portuguese Language 
Best Portuguese Language Contemporary Pop AlbumApká! — CéuN — AnaVitória
Enquanto Estamos Distantes — As Bahias e a Cozinha Mineira
Guaia — Marcelo Jeneci
Eu Feat. Você — Melim

Best Portuguese Language Rock or Alternative AlbumAmarElo — EmicidaLittle Electric Chicken Heart — Ana Frango Elétrico
Letrux Ao Prantos — Letrux
Universo Do Canto Falado — Rapadura
Na Mão as Flores — Suricata

Best Samba/Pagode AlbumSamba Jazz de Raiz, Cláudio Jorge 70 — Cláudio JorgeMangueira - A Menina dos Meus Olhos — Maria Bethânia
Martinho 8.0 - Bandeira da Fé: Um Concerto Pop-Clássico (Ao vivo) — Martinho da Vila
Fazendo Samba — Moacyr Luz e Samba do Trabalhador
Mais Feliz — Zeca Pagodinho

Best MPB (Musica Popular Brasileira) AlbumBelo Horizonte — Toninho Horta & Orquestra FantasmaO Amor no Caos Volume 2 — Zeca Baleiro
Bloco Na Rua (Deluxe) — Ney Matogrosso
Planeta Fome — Elza Soares
Caetano Veloso & Ivan Sacerdote — Caetano Veloso and Ivan Sacerdote

Best Sertaneja Music AlbumOrigens (Ao vivo em Sete Lagoas, Brazil/2019) — Paula Fernandes#Isso é Churrasco (Ao vivo) [Deluxe] — Fernando & Sorocaba
Livre Vol. 1 — Lauana Prado
Churrasco Do Teló Vol. 2 — Michel Teló
Por Mais Beijos Ao Vivo (Ao vivo) — Zé Neto & Cristiano

Best Portuguese Language Roots AlbumVeia Nordestina — Mariana AydarAqui Está-se Sossegado — Camané & Mário Laginha
Acaso Casa Ao Vivo — Mariene De Castro e Almério
Targino Sem Limites — Targino Gondim
Obatalá - Uma Homenagem a Mãe Carmen — Grupo Ofa
Autêntica — Margareth Menezes

Best Portuguese Language Song"Abricó-de-Macaco" — Francisco Bosco and João Bosco, songwriters (João Bosco) "A Tal Canção Pra Lua (Microfonado)" — Vitor Kley, songwriter (Vitor Kley & Samuel Rosa)
 "Amarelo (Sample: Sujeito de Sorte - Belchior)" — Dj Duh, Emicida and Felipe Vassão, songwriters (Emicida featuring Majur & Pabllo Vittar)
 "Libertação" — Russo Passapusso, songwriter (Elza Soares and BaianaSystem featuring Virgínia Rodrigues)
 "Pardo" — Caetano Veloso, songwriter (Céu)

Children's
Best Latin Children’s AlbumCanta y Juega — Tina KidsViva la Fiesta — Colegio de Música de Medellín
Paseo Lunar — The Lucky Band
Artistas de Profesión — Sophia
Sonidos que Cuentan — Veleta Roja

Classical
Best Classical AlbumEternal Gratitude — Paulina Leisring & Domingo Pagliuca; Samuel Pilafian, album producerJosé Antônio de Almeida Prado: Piano Concerto No. 1 - Aurora - Concerto Fribourgeois — Fabio Mechetti, Conductor, Minas Gerais Philharmonic Orchestra & Sonia Rubinsky, Soloist; Ulrich Schneider, album producer
King Mangoberry — Ricardo Lorenz, Michigan State University Wind Symphony, Manuel Alejandro Rangel, Maracas & Kevin L. Sedatole, Conductor; Sergei Kvitko & David Thornton, album producers
La Voz del Ave — Eddie Mora; Carlos Chaves & Eddie Mora, album producers
The Juliet Letters — Elena Rivera y El Cuarteto Latinoamericano; Jc Vertti, album producer

Best Classical Contemporary Composition"Sacre" — Carlos Fernando López & José Valentino, composers (Carlos Fernando López)"Dues Peces Per a Piano" — Joan Magrané, composer (Noelia Rodiles)
"Jose Serebrier: Variaciones Sinfónicas sobre Bach para Piano y Orquesta" — José Serebrier, composer (José Serebrier, Alexandre Kantorow & RTÉ National Symphony Orchestra)
"Pataruco" — Ricardo Lorenz, composer (Ricardo Lorenz, Kevin L. Sedatole Conducting Michigan State University Wind Symphony)
"Sine Nomine" — Eddie Mora, composer (Eddie Mora)

Arrangement
Best Arrangement"La Flor de la Canela"Lorenzo Ferrero, arranger (Afro-Peruvian Jazz Orchestra) "Te Extraño"
 Daniel Barón, arranger (Dani Barón)
 "Asas Fechadas"
 John Beasley & Maria Mendes, arrangers (Maria Mendes Featuring Metropole Orkest & John Beasley)
 "Bésame Mucho"
 Ariel García & Carlos Peña, arrangers (Carlos Peña y Su Big Band & Daniela Calvario)
 "Guapanguito"
 Rosino Serrano, arranger (Rosino Serrano & Orquesta Moderna Featuring Gianluca Littera & Alex Mercado)

Recording Package
Best Recording PackageSoy Puro Teatro - Homenaje a La Lupe

Pedro Fajardo, art director (Mariaca Semprún)
 Jinetes del Apocalipsis
 Victor Ricardo Aguilera Luna & Daniela Herrera Ramírez, art directors (Alejandro de la Garza)
 Lado A
 Lucia Arias, Edgar Guerra & Fabli Soto, art directors (Alerta Rocket)
 MSDL - Canciones dentro de canciones
 Vetusta Morla & Pequeño Salto Mortal, art directors (Vetusta Morla)
 Salto al Color
 Eva Amaral, Xavi Blanco & Charis Tsavis, art directors (Amaral)

Production
Best Engineered Album
3:33

Daniel Bitrán Arizpe, Daniel Dávila, Justin Moshkevich, George Noriega, Erick Roman, Paul Rubinstein & JC Vertti, engineers; Miles Comaskey, Najeeb Jones & Tony Maserati, mixers; Dale Becker, mastering engineer (Debi Nova)
 Aire (Versión Día)
 Eduardo Del Aguila, Keith Gretlein, Julian Prindle, Curt Schneider, Sasha Sirota & Oskar Winberg, engineers; Josh Gudwin, mixer; Colin Leonard, mastering engineer (Jesse & Joy)
 Apká!
 Alexandre Fontanetti, Diogo Poças & Pupillo, engineers; Mike Cresswell, mixer; Felipe Tichauer, mastering engineer (Céu)
 Quimera
 Mon Dvy, Alex Ferrer, Diogo Guerra, Felipe Guevara, Innercut, Red Mojo, Stego & Filipe Survival, mixers; Alex Ferrer & Carlos Hernández Carbonell, mastering engineers (Alba Reche)
 Sublime
 John "Beetle" Bailey, engineer; John "Beetle" Bailey, mixer; Harry Hess, mastering engineer (Alex Cuba)

Producer of the Year 
Andrés Torres and Mauricio Rengifo
 A Dónde Vamos (Morat)
 Cartagena (Fonseca and Silvestre Dangond)
 Colegio (Cali y El Dandee)
 Falta Amor (Sebastián Yatra, Ricky Martin)
 Girasoles (Luis Fonsi)
 Infinito (Andrés Cepeda and Jesse y Joy)
 + (Aitana and Cali y El Dandee)
 Mi Otra Mitad (Manuel Medrano)
 Minifalda (Greeicy and Juanes)
 Perdiendo La Cabeza (Carlos Rivera, Becky G and Pedro Capó)
 Recuerdo (Tini, Mau y Ricky)
 Runaway (Sebastián Yatra, Daddy Yankee, Natti Natasha and Jonas Brothers)
 TBT (Sebastián Yatra, Rauw Alejandro, Manuel Turizo)
 Rafa Arcaute
 Buena (Manuel Medrano) 
 Buenos Aires (Nathy Peluso) 
 Business Woman (Nathy Peluso) 
 Copa Glasé (Nathy Peluso) 
 La Mentira (Dani Martín featuring Joaquín Sabina) 
 "Laligera" (Lali) 
 Los Huesos (Dani Martín and Juanes) 
 No Se Perdona (Rels B y Nathy Peluso) 
 Quiero Vivir (Draco Rosa) 
 Tutu (Remix) (Camilo, Shakira and Pedro Capó) 
 Eudardo Cabra "Visitante"
  
 Mi Derriengue (Riccie Oriach) 
 Orígenes (Sotomayor) 
 Que Empiece El Juego (El Cuarteto de Nos)
 Tiburones En El Bosque (El Cuarteto de Nos)
 Pablo Díaz-Reixa "El Guincho"
 A Palé (Rosalía) 
 Dio$ No$ Libre Del Dinero (Rosalía) 
 Goteo (Paloma Mami) 
 Juro Que (Rosalía) 
 Me Quedo (Aitana, Lola Índigo) 
 Yalo Yale (Dellafuente) 
 Yo X Ti, Tu X Mi (Rosalía and Ozuna) 
 George Noriega
 Amor y Traición (Cabas) 
 Mundo Paralelo (Monsieur Periné, Pedro Capó) 
 No Ha Parado De Llover (Maná and Sebastián Yatra) 
 No Le Llames Amor (Yuridia) 
 No Pienso Volver (Ednita Nazario) 
 No Vuelvas (Ednita Nazario) 
 Puta (J Mena) 
 Te Dejo Ir (Andrés Cepeda) 
 Vamos A Mi Ritmo (Lasso and Isabela Souza)

Music video
Best Short Form Music Video
"TKN" — Rosalía and Travis Scott

Canadá, video director; Oscar Romagosa & Laura Serra Estorch, video producers
 "Saci (Remix)" — BaianaSystem and Tropkillaz
 Rafael Kent, video director; Tânia Assumpção & Rafael Marquez, video producers
 "Rojo" — J Balvin
 Colin Tilley, video director; Jamee Ranta, video producer
 "Cubana" — Biyolt
 Gabriel Augusto & Quemuel Cornelius, video directors; Francesco Civita & Henrique Danieletto, video producers
 "Para Ya" — Porter
Alexis Gómez, video director; Michelle Lacoste, video producer

Best Long Form Music Video
El Mundo Perdido de Cumbiana — Carlos Vives

Carlos Felipe Montoya, video director; Isabel Cristina Vásquez, video producer
 Una Vuelta al Sol — Amaia
 Marc Pujolar, video director; Júlia Orbegoso & David Serrano, video producers
 The Warrior Women of Afro-Peruvian Music — Just Play Peru
 Matt Geraghty, Araceli Poma & Daniel Thissen, video directors; Matt Geraghty & Araceli Poma, video producers
 Los Tigres del Norte at Folsom Prison — Los Tigres del Norte
 Tim Donahue, video director; Ilan Arboleda, Zach Horowitz, Los Tigres Del Norte & Jessicya Materano, video producers
 Relato de la Mmemoria Futuro — Siddharta
 Arturo Fabián De La Fuente & Cristóbal González Camarena, video directors; Arturo Fabián De La Fuente & Cristóbal González Camarena, video producers

References 

2020 in Latin music
2020 in Florida
2020 music awards
2020
November 2020 events in the United States